Hopea shingkeng was a species of plant in the family Dipterocarpaceae. It was endemic to the eastern Himalaya region of India.

"Flora of China" reports the species from southeast Tibet. Nevertheless, the reported altitude range makes this record suspect. The species is not listed among the protected plants of China.

References

shingkeng
Flora of Arunachal Pradesh
Extinct flora of Asia
Taxonomy articles created by Polbot